Ludovico Antonio David was born at Lugano in 1648. After studying for some time at Milan, under the Cavaliere Cairo and Ercole Procaccini, he went to Bologna, where he entered the school of Carlo Cignani. He was a painter of some eminence, and gave proof of his ability in the churches and convents of Milan and of Venice. In the church of San Silvestro, in the latter city, is a picture of the Nativity, more resembling the finished style of Camillo than that of Ercole Procaccini. He also painted the portraits of many of the distinguished persons of his time.

Lodovico David died after 1709.

References

External links 
 

1648 births
Year of death unknown
17th-century Swiss painters
Swiss male painters
People from Lugano